Bruno Junk (27 September 1929 – 22 September 1995) was an Estonian race walker. He competed for the Soviet Union at the 1952 and 1956 Olympics and won bronze medals on both occasions. He set a world record in the 15 km in 1951 (1:08:08.0), and had world's best times in the 20 km in 1956 (1:30:00.8) and in the 3 km in 1952 (11:51.4). Domestically he won four Soviet titles: in 1951 and 1956 in the 20 km, and in 1952 and 1953 in the 10 km, and eight Estonian titles: in 1949–50 and 1956–59 in the 20 km, in 1958 in the 10 km, and in 1959 in the 30 km.

Junk took up race walking in 1948 and retired in 1959. He later worked as an athletics coach at Dünamo Tallinn club, serving as its vice-president in 1976–1979. He was also vice-president (1964–1970) and then president (1979–1987) of the Estonian Athletics Federation. In parallel Junk worked for the Estonian Ministry of Internal Affairs and wrote for the Estonian sports periodicals Kehakultuur and Spordileht. Since 1996 an annual memorial race walking tournament has been held in his honor in his birth town of Valga. There is a street named after him in Puka, Estonia, a borough near Valga.

References

External links
 
 
 
 

1929 births
1995 deaths
Sportspeople from Valga, Estonia
Estonian male racewalkers
Soviet male racewalkers
Olympic athletes of the Soviet Union
Olympic bronze medalists for the Soviet Union
Athletes (track and field) at the 1952 Summer Olympics
Athletes (track and field) at the 1956 Summer Olympics
Dynamo sports society athletes
Medalists at the 1956 Summer Olympics
Medalists at the 1952 Summer Olympics
Olympic bronze medalists in athletics (track and field)